Colonel Douglas George Leopold Cunnington (April 20, 1885 – May 9, 1973) was a farmer, advertising agent, insurance salesman, soldier and a politician at the federal and municipal levels in Canada.

Early life
Cunnington for a time lived in British Guiana, he moved to Canada in 1910 settling in British Columbia, a year later he moved east to the Calgary region and set up a dairy farm.

Military career
Cunnington joined the Canadian Forces in 1915 during World War I. He rose through the ranks to become a Colonel. He was shot and believed killed in action at Battle of Amiens. He was instead taken prisoner, and his wounds were treated by the Germans. He remained a Prisoner of War until the cessation of hostilities. (In a curious incident that received attention in the press, the German troops who took him prisoner left behind some of his effects. These were subsequently found, and identified, by Canadian troops who happened upon the scene. Presuming the colonel to be dead, the items were interred under a marker inscribed with his name, and a photograph taken of the grave was forwarded to Cunnington's wife. Thus, the Cunnington family possessed a photograph of what was believed to be Col. Cunnington's grave several decades before his actual death.) After being released by the Germans in 1919 Cunnington got a job as an advertising agent with the Calgary Herald.  He left that position in 1926 to establish an insurance business.

Political career
Cunnington was elected to Calgary City Council for the first time in 1935 he served as an Alderman until 1939 when he made the jump to federal politics.

Cunnington ran for the House of Commons of Canada in the Calgary West electoral district in a by-election held on January 28, 1939. He would replace former Prime Minister Richard Bennett as the representative for that district, by acclamation as the Liberal candidate withdrew. After his acclimation Cunnington moved his family to Ottawa, Ontario he took his seat in the House of Commons of Canada on January 25, 1940 the same day that parliament was dissolved.

Cunnington would return to Calgary to contest the election be defeated by Manley Edwards a candidate from the Liberals in the 1940 Canadian federal election. In that election Cunnington ran under the National Government banner. He would not return to federal politics.

References

External links
 

1885 births
1973 deaths
Canadian Expeditionary Force officers
Calgary city councillors
Conservative Party of Canada (1867–1942) MPs
Members of the House of Commons of Canada from Alberta
Canadian prisoners of war in World War I
World War I prisoners of war held by Germany
People from Bridgnorth
English emigrants to Canada
British Guiana people
Canadian expatriates in England